Francesca da Rimini is an 1831 opera by Saverio Mercadante to a libretto by Felice Romani based on Silvio Pellico's play which had already been set twice and ultimately was set by fifteen composers. It was to be premiered in Madrid in 1831, but the premiere was cancelled and the opera lost. It was rediscovered and performed in July 2016 at the Palazzo Ducale, Martina Franca for the Festival della Valle d'Itria, Italy.

Recording
Francesca da Rimini Fabio Luisi, Dynamic DVD 2017

References

Operas by Saverio Mercadante
Italian-language operas
1831 operas
Operas
Works based on Inferno (Dante)
Operas based on plays
Operas set in the 13th century
Operas set in Italy
Operas based on real people
Cultural depictions of Francesca da Rimini
Operas based on works by Dante Alighieri